The Lyndon Baines Johnson Library and Museum, also known as the LBJ Presidential Library, is the presidential library and museum of Lyndon Baines Johnson, the 36th president of the United States (1963–1969). It is located on the grounds of the University of Texas at Austin, and is one of 13 presidential libraries administered by the National Archives and Records Administration. The LBJ Library houses 45 million pages of historical documents, including the papers of President Johnson and those of his close associates and others.

History

Discussions for a Presidential library for President Johnson began soon after his 1964 election victory. In February 1965, the chairman of the Board of Regents at the University of Texas at Austin, William H. Heath, proposed building the library on the university campus, along with funds to construct the building and the establishment of the Johnson School of Public Affairs on the campus. The agreement was formally reached on September 6, 1966. While past Presidential libraries were funded by private donations, the publicly-funded University of Texas paid $15 million of the $18 million needed to construct the complex and donated the land for the library, which was formerly a low-income neighborhood acquired by the university using eminent domain.

First Lady Lady Bird Johnson toured existing Presidential libraries and university campuses to consult the design of the library. Lady Bird presented three potential architects to President Johnson; Gordon Bunshaft of Skidmore, Owings & Merrill was chosen. The design was completed in the Summer of 1966 and construction began in 1967. The Library was dedicated on May 22, 1971, with Johnson and then-President Richard Nixon in attendance. 

In 1991 Queen Elizabeth II visited the museum and met with President Johnson's family.

After her death in July 2007, the body of Lady Bird Johnson lay in repose in the Library and Museum, just as her husband's had after his death, 34 years earlier in January 1973.

In 2012, the LBJ Library underwent a multimillion-dollar redesign, during which most of the exhibits were closed. On December 22, the Library reopened to the public. In 2013, the Library began charging admission for the first time since its dedication in 1971. Mark Atwood Lawrence is the current director of the LBJ Library.

Features
The complex, which was designed by Skidmore, Owings & Merrill architects Gordon Bunshaft and R. Max Brooks, is an unadorned 10-story building clad in cream Italian travertine. Library, adjacent to the Lyndon B. Johnson School of Public Affairs, occupies a 14-acre (57,000 m2) campus.  Although the Library is on the grounds of UT Austin, it is federally run and independent from the University. The top floor of the Library has a 7/8ths scale replica of the Oval Office decorated as it was during Johnson's presidency, including the Johnson desk. Another exhibit features an animatronic LBJ. The view of the Texas State Capitol from the library's terrace became one of the Capitol View Corridors protected under state and local law from obstruction by tall buildings in 1983.

The LBJ Library provides year-round public viewing of its permanent historical, cultural, and temporary exhibits to approximately 125,000 visitors each year. It is open from 9 a.m. until 5 p.m. seven days a week throughout the year. The Library is closed on Thanksgiving, Christmas, and New Year's Day.

Among the artworks on display at the Library and Museum is a photoengraved mural depicting scenes from Johnson's life created by Naomi Savage.

LBJ Liberty & Justice for All Award 
The library honors public servants with the "LBJ Liberty & Justice for All Award." The award is given to leaders who demonstrate civility and bipartisanship. Recipients have included Justice Ruth Bader Ginsburg, President George H. W. Bush, Congressman John Lewis, Congressman John Dingell, Senator Carl Levin, and Senator John McCain.

See also
D. B. Hardeman Prize
Presidential memorials in the United States

References

Further reading
Benjamin Hufbauer, Presidential Temples: How Memorials and Libraries Shape Public Memory (University Press of Kansas, 2005).  See ch.3: "Symbolic Power, Democratic Access, and the Imperial Presidency: The Johnson Library."

External links

 
 The LBJ School of Public Affairs

1971 establishments in Texas
History museums in Texas
Library buildings completed in 1971
Johnson Library and Museum
Library and Museum
Museums established in 1971
Johnson Library and Museum
Johnson, L
Presidential museums in Texas
Skidmore, Owings & Merrill buildings
University of Texas at Austin campus
Civil rights movement museums
University and college buildings completed in 1971